The Succession to the Crown Act 1603 (1 Jac. I c.1), full title A most joyful and just recognition of the immediate, lawful and undoubted Succession, Descent and Right of the Crown, was an Act of Parliament of the Parliament of England enacted during the reign of James I. The Act recited the loyalty of Parliament to James, and stated that the English crown, on the death of Elizabeth I, had come to him "by inherent birthright and lawful and undoubted succession". It acknowledged him as the legitimate king "of England, Scotland, France and Ireland". The Act was repealed by the Statute Law Revision Act 1948, having become obsolete in the intervening three centuries.

See also
 Succession to the British throne

References
Select statutes and other constitutional documents illustrative of the reigns of Elizabeth and James I, ed. by G. W. Prothero. Oxford University Press, 1913. Fourth edition.
Chronological table of the statutes; HMSO, London. 1993.
Text of the 1603 Act

1603 in law
1603 in England
Acts of the Parliament of England
Succession to the British crown